Exor N.V. is a Dutch holding company incorporated in Netherlands and controlled by the Agnelli family through privately held company Giovanni Agnelli B.V. In 2021 it recorded revenues of more than $136 billion, with a Net Asset Value (NAV) of around $31 billion, becoming the 37th largest group in the world by revenue, according to the 2021  Fortune Global 500 List. It has a history of investments running over a century, which currently include auto and truck manufacturers Stellantis, Ferrari and Iveco, agricultural and construction firm CNH Industrial, the association football club Juventus F.C., the international newspaper The Economist, and the Italian media company GEDI.

History

The company was founded on 27 July 1927 under the name of Istituto Finanziario Industriale by the Senator Giovanni Agnelli, with the aim of reuniting under a single company all the shareholdings he had acquired, mainly in industrial sectors.

In 1957, IFI acquired control of Istituto Commerciale Laniero Italiano, which conducted activities in the financial field, particularly in the textile and wool sector. In 1963 it extended its operations to the banking system and changed its name to Istituto Bancario Italiano Laniero. Three years later, having spun off the banking business to Banca Subalpina, the company became Istituto Finanziario Italiano Laniero (IFIL), playing a parallel role to that of IFI and conducting similar investment management activities.

IFI gained holdings in numerous firms over the decades, including Unicem, Rockfeller Center, Cinzano, Club Med and 3M, which have been divested over time. IFI listed preference shares on the Borsa Italiana in 1968.

A reorganisation of the Agnelli family's holdings in 2008 led to the merger of IFI and IFIL to create "Exor", the new name being taken from the French company (then the majority owner of Perrier water and the Château Margaux estate) which it acquired in 1991. Exor started trading with the ticker BIT: EXO on March 2, 2009.

Board of directors

Board of Directors in charge as of May 24, 2022:

 Ajay Banga - Chairman
 John Elkann - Chief executive officer
 Alessandro Nasi - Non-executive director
 Andrea Agnelli - Non-executive director
 Axel Dumas - Non-executive director
 Melissa Bethell - Non-executive director
 Marc Bolland - Non-executive director
 Laurence Debroux - Non-executive director
 Ginevra Elkann - Non-executive director

Holding
Exor's portfolio is principally composed by different Companies in which Exor is the largest shareholder. In addition, the holding manages other investments, of four different kind: Private, for unlisted companies - Public, for publicly-listed companies - Seeds, for early and late stage companies and Alliance, currently with one: NUO spa.

Companies 
Declared shareholdings as of 28 February 2022:

Besides these major holdings, the company holds shares in the following listed and unlisted companies:

Financial investments
 Cameco
 Faurecia
 Ocado Group
 Schlumberger

Ventures
Exor's interest in new 21st century companies led to the launch of Exor Seeds, later to become Exor Ventures, an early and late stage startup investment business, under the leadership of Noam Ohana since 2017. Exor Seeds has invested 700 million dollars in 53 companies around the world with a focus on mobility, fintech and healthcare sectors.

In September 2021 Exor appointed Diego Piacentini, former Amazon and Apple Executive Manager, as Advisor of Exor and Chairman of Exor Seeds.

On March 29, 2022, Exor Seeds announced the launch of the Italy Seeds Program, an initiative aimed to support the most promising Italian startups.

Alan
Apparis
Avant Arte
Because
Brex
Cariuma
CARS24
Casavo
Corvent
Cover
Cowboy
Crusoe
Dignifi
DRL
Earlens
EMPG
EQrx
Firefly
FIIT
Finhabits
Galena
Kheiron
Norbert Health
Lithic
Reby
Reflexion
Inspirna
Saildrone
Smallhold
Tekion
True Link
Via Transportation
Viaduct
Wayve
Caresend
Dice
Dustphotonic
Karat
Newcleo
Qashier
Quantum machines
Radian Aerospace
Saltpay
Solidus labs
Tissium
Xsight
Zenbill
Qonto
Emerge
VIAVIA
Munbi
Upways
Banias
Chain Reaction
Backed
Milkshake
Resilience
Bizaway
Nebuly
Humans

Shareholders

Financial data 

Adjusted following the classification of FCA Group and PartnerRe Group as a discontinued operation.

Investor Days

On 5 October 2017 EXOR held its first Investor Day event, which was led by Exor & PartnerRe's leadership teams which provided financial updates and the latest developments from their respective companies.

On 21 November 2019 a second one was hosted on the occasion of Exor's 10th anniversary. During the meeting John Elkann, together with the management team, illustrated the company's performances, growth and key achievements over the past 10 years.

On 30 November 2021 Exor held its third Investor Day where the primary focus of its future investments was shared, centered on three main sectors: Healthcare, Luxury and Technology.

All events took place at the Agnelli Foundation in Turin (Italy).

Partners Council

On May 24, 2018, Exor established the Partners Council, chaired by former UK Chancellor of the Exchequer George Osborne. The Council brings together a group of business leaders that provide additional external experience and counsel into Exor.

On September 27, 2021, Jony Ive, former Apple Chief Design Officer of Apple, joined Exor's Partners Council along with the announcement of a multi-year collaboration with his creative collective LoveFrom.

The Council consists of: George Osborne (Chairman) - Partner, Robey Warshaw; Daniel Ek - CEO and Founder, Spotify; John Elkann - chairman and CEO, Exor; Jony Ive - Co-founder, LoveFrom; Michael Larson - Chief Investment Officer, BMGI; Jorge Paulo Lemann - Co-founder, 3G Capital; Ruth Porat - Senior Vice President and Chief Financial Officer, Alphabet and Google; Nassef Sawiris - CEO, OCI ; Neil Shen - Founding and Managing Partner, Sequoia Capital China; Rob Speyer - President and CEO, Tishman Speyer; Joseph Tsai - Executive Vice Chairman, Alibaba Group; Mike Volpi - Co-founder, Index Ventures; Ruth Wertheimer - Founder, Owner and chairwoman, 7-Main.

Latest transactions 

Exor actively supported the consolidiation of the car industry, first with the creation of Fiat Chrysler Automobiles in 2014 and later with Stellantis, which merged FCA and PSA.

Since inception in march 2009, Exor’s total shareholders return was +1,460% or 24% on a compound annual rate. The family firm Giovanni Agnelli B.V. owns 52.01% of the share capital.

The Economist
On 12 August 2015 the editor announced that Exor would purchase three-fifths of The Economist Group shares then owned by Pearson PLC. Exor held shares in the Economist Group prior to this purchase. This was considered to be the "most important change to The Economists shareholding structure in almost 90 years." Pearson PLC which also owned the Financial Times had had a non-controlling 50% stake in the Economist Group since 1928. The Economist Group will buy back the remaining 40% of Pearson shares.

Cushman & Wakefield
On 2 September 2015 Exor closed the sale of Cushman & Wakefield to Chicago-based DTZ for $1,28 billion in net, generating a capital gain of $722 million.

PartnerRe
In 2016, Exor bought PartnerRe with a bid of $140 per share (total $6.9 billion). Originally it had offered $130 per share and in response Axis Re offered $120.31 per share in paper plus $11.50 in a pre-closing dividend.

In March 2020, Exor announced an agreement to sell PartnerRe to French mutual insurer Covea for $9 billion plus a $50 million cash dividend upon closing. The sale was not finalised, as Covéa withdrew the offer on 12 May 2020. In August 2020, Exor stated that Covea would invest €1.5 billion, partly in entities managed by PartnerRe. In July 2022 Exor completed the sale of PartnerRe to Covéa for a total cash consideration of $9.3 billion (about 8.6 billion euros).

GEDI Gruppo Editoriale
In December 2019, Exor agreed to buy a 43.7 per cent stake in GEDI Gruppo Editoriale, Italy's leading media group, for €102.4m from CIR, the holding company of the De Benedetti dynasty. The acquisition was closed in April 2020.

Stellantis
In December 2019, Fiat Chrysler Automobiles and the PSA Group announced a merger, to be completed in 12/14 months. In July 2020, FCA's Chairman John Elkann and the CEO Mike Manley announced that the combined company will be called Stellantis, upon completion of the trans-Atlantic merger. The merger completed on 16 January 2021, with its common shares subsequently trading under the ticker symbol "STLA" on the Italian Bourse, Euronext Paris and the New York Stock Exchange. At the completion date of merger, the combined company became the world's fifth-largest car maker by unit sales.

On 14 April 2021, Exor and Peugeot 1810, both significant shareholders in Stellantis, signed a five-year agreement.

Via Transportation Inc.
In April 2020, Exor acquired 8.87% of Via Transportation. The participation was later increased to 16.9%.

Shang Xia Group 
In December 2020, Exor announced an investment of circa €80 million in the Chinese group Shang Xia, thanks to which the holding became the first Shang Xia shareholder with Hermés International.

Christian Louboutin 
In March 2021, Exor enters the French fashion house Christian Louboutin as a minority shareholder with 24% of the capital and with an investment of 541 million euros.

Nuo 
On June 16, 2021, Exor signed an agreement with World-Wide Investments Company Limited of Hong Kong, setting up the newco Nuo spa, 50% owned by Exor and 50% owned by WWICL, to encourage and enhance the development of Italian medium-sized enterprises that produce high-end consumer goods like Ludovico Martelli and Montura.

Institut Mérieux 
On July 2022 Exor acquired, by way of a reserved capital increase, a 10% shareholding in Institut Mérieux, representing an investment of €833 million to support the company and provide innovative solutions in the public health field.

References

External links

Holding companies established in 2008
Companies based in Amsterdam
Conglomerate companies of the Netherlands
Holding companies of the Netherlands
2008 establishments in the Netherlands
Agnelli family